The Most Beautiful Woman in the World (German: Die schönste Frau der Welt) is a 1924 German silent film directed by Richard Eichberg and starring Lee Parry, Livio Pavanelli and Olaf Fjord. It premiered in Berlin at the Marmorhaus.

The film's sets were designed by the art directors Jacek Rotmil and Wilhelm Depenau. Location shooting took place at Amalfi in southern Italy.

Cast
 Lee Parry 
 Livio Pavanelli
 Olaf Fjord
 Inge Colette
 
 Georg Alexander
 Henry Bender
 Richard Eichberg

References

Bibliography
 Bock, Hans-Michael & Bergfelder, Tim. The Concise CineGraph. Encyclopedia of German Cinema. Berghahn Books, 2009.
 Krautz, Alfred. International directory of cinematographers, set- and costume designers in film, Volume 4. Saur, 1984.

External links

1924 films
Films of the Weimar Republic
Films directed by Richard Eichberg
German silent feature films
German black-and-white films
Films shot in Italy